"Dheeme Dheeme" is a Hindi romantic song by Tony Kakkar, released as a single by Desi Music Factory on 8 May 2019 via YouTube and online music streaming services.

Background 
The song was composed and written by Tony Kakkar, and was released under the label Desi Music Factory. Music video of this song was produced by Anshul Garg, co-produced by Raghav Sharma and directed by Parth Gupta & Gurdas. The video features actress-model Neha Sharma. The song and its music video was released on 8 May 2019.

Reception 
Music video has 548 million views on YouTube as of November 2020.

Personnel 
 Song: "Dheeme Dheeme"
 Artist: Tony Kakkar
 Starring: Tony Kakkar ft. Neha Sharma
 Music, Lyrics & Composition: Tony Kakkar
 Producer: Anshul Garg
 Co-Producer: Raghav Sharma
 Director: Parth Gupta & Gurdas
 DOP: Sukh Kambooj
 Production: Aman Production
 Label: Desi Music Factory

Note 
 All credits for the personnel can be found on the description of the song's official music video on YouTube.

Remake

A remake version of this song was used in the 2019 film Pati, Patni Aur Woh starring Kartik Aaryan, Bhumi Pednekar, and Ananya Pandey. The song was recreated by Tanishk Bagchi with a dance club beat, with Kakkar once again singing the song, with additional vocals by Neha Kakkar.

References 

Hindi songs
2019 singles
Tony Kakkar songs
Indian songs